The Football League Trophy 1996–97, known as the Auto Windscreens Shield 1996–97 for sponsorship reasons, was the 14th staging of the Football League Trophy, a knock-out competition for English football clubs in Second and Third Division. The winners were Carlisle United and the runners-up were Colchester United.

The competition began on 7 December 1996 and ended with the final on 20 April 1997 at the Wembley Stadium.

In the first round, there were two sections: North and South. In the following rounds each section gradually eliminates teams in knock-out fashion until each has a winning finalist. At this point, the two winning finalists face each other in the combined final for the honour of the trophy.

First round
Crewe Alexandra, Lincoln City, Mansfield Town, Scunthorpe United, Shrewsbury Town, Wigan Athletic, Wrexham and York City from the North section all received byes.

Barnet, Bristol City, Exeter City, Northampton Town, Peterborough United, Torquay United, Walsall and Watford from the South section all received byes.

Northern Section

Southern Section

Second round

Northern Section

Southern Section

Quarter-finals

Northern Section

Southern Section

Area semi-finals

Northern Section

Southern Section

Area finals

Northern Area final

Carlisle United beat Stockport County 2–0 on aggregate.

Southern Area final

Colchester United beat Peterborough United 3–2 on aggregate.

Final

Notes

External links
Official website
 

EFL Trophy
Tro
1996–97 domestic association football cups